Local Authority Council and Regional Council Elections in Namibia were held from 30 November to 3 December 1992.

Results

Local Authority Councils

Regional Councils
A total of 534,437 voters were registered, but 64,431 were in uncontested constituencies.

References

Local and regional elections in Namibia
Namibia
1992 in Namibia
November 1992 events in Africa
December 1992 events in Africa